Sendinblue is a SaaS solution for relationship marketing. The company was founded in 2007 by Armand Thiberge and Kapil Sharma, and offers a cloud-based marketing communication software suite with email marketing, transactional email, marketing automation, customer-relationship management, landing pages, Facebook ads, retargeting ads, SMS marketing, and more.

The company has four offices globally, which are located in Paris, Delhi, Seattle, and Berlin. The headquarters are located in the Paris office, which is also home to the customer service, marketing, product, and technical teams. There are currently 180,000 firms using it worldwide. This software has a ton of functionality, including AB/testing, sophisticated report production, and contact list management.

History 
Sendinblue was founded in 2012, and is headquartered in Paris.

The software was first launched in 2012 in French, and allowed for the creation of newsletters and transactional emails.

In 2013, Sendinblue became available in English and Spanish. SMS became available in 2013. Services in Portuguese and Italian were launched in 2014. 2015 saw the opening of the US office in Seattle, which allowed for more expansive customer service support for North American users. German services were also launched in 2015. In June 2016, Sendinblue launched its marketing automation platform.

Sendinblue was chosen as one of 20 startups to watch in 2016 by Forbes magazine.

References 

French companies established in 2012
Companies based in Paris
Software companies of France
Email marketing software
Privately held companies of France